Qahtan (or Kahtan)  and Qahtani (Kahtani) or with the definite article al- as Al-Qahtani (Al-Kahtani) meaning coming from Qahtan may refer to: 
 
Qahtan (tribe),  an Arab tribal confederation in Saudi Arabia
Qahtanite or Qahtani, Arabs who originate from the southern region of the Arabian Peninsula, especially from Yemen

Places
Al Qahtan, a village in Saudi Arabia, located in the northern part of Al-Namas governorate
Al-Qahtaniyah, Raqqa Governorate, a town in Raqqa Governorate in northern Syria
Al-Qahtaniyah, al-Hasakah Governorate, a town in al-Hasakah Governorate in northeastern Syria
Qahtaniyah, Iraq, an Iraqi town about 100 km (62 mi) from Mosul and a few miles south of Sinjar

People

Given name
Qahtan al-Attar (born 1950), Iraqi singer
Qahtan Chathir Drain, Iraqi national footballer 
Qahtan Muhammad al-Shaabi (1920–1981) South Yemeni politician, the first President of the People's Republic of South Yemen

Middle name
Najeeb Qahtan Al-Sha'abi (born 1953), Yemeni politician

Surname

Qahtan
Abdul Qader Qahtan (born 1952), Yemeni jurist
Riya Qahtan, Iraqi Kurdish politician

Al-Qahtani
Surname derived from the Qahtanite, Qahtani or Qahtan people from Arabia
Abu Maria al-Qahtani (Maysar Ali Musa Abdullah al-Juburi),  Iraqi Islamic militant fighting in the Syrian Civil War and a former commander and Shura Council member in Jabhat al-Nusra
Abdullah Hamid Mohammed Al-Qahtani, Guantanamo detainee
Abdul Atif Al-Qahtani, Saudi javelin thrower
Attiya Al-Qahtani (born 1953), Saudi middle-distance runner
Abdulrahman Al-Qahtani (born 1983), Saudi Arabian footballer
Haji Bakr Al-Qahtani (born 1964), Saudi Arabian sprinter
Iman al-Qahtani, Saudi journalist and activist
Jabir Hasan Muhamed Al Qahtani, Guantanamo detainee
Jabran al-Qahtani, Guantanamo detainee
Khaled Al-Qahtani (born 1985), Kuwaiti footballer
Majed Al-Qahtani (born 1990), Saudi footballer
Mohammed al-Qahtani (disambiguation), many people with the name including
Mohammed al-Qahtani (Mohammed Mani Ahmad al-Qahtani), Guantanamo detainee, "20th hijacker"
Mohammad Fahad al-Qahtani, co-founder of a Saudi Arabian human rights organisation
Mohammed Saleh Al Qahtani, Board Member of the Boy Scouts of Bahrain
Mohammed Abdullah Al Qahtani, World Champion of Public Speaking 2015
Saud al-Qahtani, a Saudi Arabian consultant and former royal court advisor, allegedly involved in the assassination of Jamal Khashoggi
Sultan Jubran Sultan al-Qahtani, known as Zubayr Al-Rimi (1974–2003), a militant in al-Qaeda's Saudi wing 
Talal Al Qahtani (born 1987), Qatari footballer
Yasser Al-Qahtani, Saudi Arabian footballer

Al-Kahtani
Muhammad Jafar Jamal al-Kahtani, citizen of Saudi Arabia who was a captive held in extrajudicial detention in the United States' Bagram Theater Internment Facility

See also
al-Qahtani (disambiguation)
Al-Qahtaniyah (disambiguation)
Bani Qahtan Castle, castle in the Syrian Coastal Mountains near Lattakia

Arabic given names
Arabic-language surnames